Mézières-en-Gâtinais (literally "Mézières in Gâtinais") is a commune in the Loiret department in north-central France.

See also
Communes of the Loiret department
Siege of Mézières (1870–1871)

References

Mezieresengatinais